Fra Diavolo (1771–1806) the Neapolitan guerrilla leader

Fra Diavolo can refer to:

 Fra diavolo sauce, a sauce
 Fra Diavolo (opera), an 1830 opera by Daniel Auber
 The Devil's Brother, a 1933 Laurel and Hardy film also known as Fra Diavolo
 The Adventures of Fra Diavolo, a 1942 film

See also
Diavolo (disambiguation)